Hingaia is a rural coastal suburb of Auckland, New Zealand. It is located on the shores of the Pahurehure Inlet, to the southwest of the Papakura Town Centre.

History
During the major reformation of local government in 1989, Hingaia was included into the Papakura District boundaries. In 2010, after a review of the Royal Commission on Auckland Governance, the entire Auckland Region was amalgamated into a single city authority. As well as the former Papakura District, all other territorial authorities were merged into a single Auckland Council. The suburb of Hingaia is part of the Manurewa-Papakura ward.

Demographics

Hingaia had a population of 4,368 at the 2018 New Zealand census, an increase of 2,706 people (162.8%) since the 2013 census, and an increase of 3,726 people (580.4%) since the 2006 census. There were 1,425 households, comprising 2,106 males and 2,262 females, giving a sex ratio of 0.93 males per female, with 951 people (21.8%) aged under 15 years, 633 (14.5%) aged 15 to 29, 2,082 (47.7%) aged 30 to 64, and 705 (16.1%) aged 65 or older.

Ethnicities were 58.4% European/Pākehā, 7.6% Māori, 4.1% Pacific peoples, 36.2% Asian, and 3.0% other ethnicities. People may identify with more than one ethnicity.

The percentage of people born overseas was 39.6, compared with 27.1% nationally.

Although some people chose not to answer the census's question about religious affiliation, 42.0% had no religion, 34.2% were Christian, 0.3% had Māori religious beliefs, 8.4% were Hindu, 1.9% were Muslim, 1.9% were Buddhist and 6.0% had other religions.

Of those at least 15 years old, 1,053 (30.8%) people had a bachelor's or higher degree, and 456 (13.3%) people had no formal qualifications. 1,047 people (30.6%) earned over $70,000 compared to 17.2% nationally. The employment status of those at least 15 was that 1,833 (53.6%) people were employed full-time, 411 (12.0%) were part-time, and 72 (2.1%) were unemployed.

Education
The school opened in 2012.

It was founded in 2001.

Both these schools are coeducational. Rolls are as of

References

External links
Auckland Council

Suburbs of Auckland